Cherskii's thicklip gudgeon (Sarcocheilichthys czerskii) is a species of cyprinid fish endemic to the Amur River basin.

Named in honor of ornithologist Alexander Ivanovich Czerski (1879-1921, son of Jan Czerski [1845-1892], celebrated Polish geologist, naturalist and explorer), who collected the type specimen.

References

Sarcocheilichthys
Taxa named by Lev Berg
Fish described in 1914